Secrets of a Door-to-Door Salesman is a 1973 sex comedy film directed by Wolf Rilla. Also known as Naughty Wives.

Plot
The film is about a young man who gets a job as a vacuum salesman and finds that he has to fight off advances from female customers.

Cast
Brendan Price – David Clyde
Sue Longhurst – Penny
Felicity Devonshire – Susanne
Victoria Burgoyne – Sally Cockburn
Graham Stark - Charlie Vincent
Chic Murray – Policeman
Bernard Spear - Jake Tripper
Jean Harrington – Martina
Steve Patterson – Anthony Clyde
Jacqueline Logan – Mrs. Donovan
Elizabeth Romilly – Nancy
Jan Servais – Jane
Jacqueline Afrique – Rachel
Johnny Briggs - Loman
Karen Boyes – Girlfriend
David Rayner – Bruce, the art director
Ron Alexander – Ron, the assistant
Noelle Finch – Edith Simons, the reporter

References

External links

1973 films
1970s sex comedy films
British sex comedy films
1970s English-language films
Films directed by Wolf Rilla
1973 comedy films
1970s British films
Films about salespeople